Mini-Wakan State Park is located north of Spirit Lake, Iowa, United States.  The  park is along the north shore of Big Spirit Lake.  It provides space for picnicking, hiking, biking, swimming, boating and fishing on the lake.  The park is connected to the Dickinson County trail system in Iowa and the Jackson County trail system in Minnesota.  It was listed as a historic district on the National Register of Historic Places in 2010.

History
Local residents acquired the initial  for Mini-Wakan.  Civilian Conservation Corps Company 778 began park development sometime between the beginning of June and the end of October 1933 as part of their work with the National Forest Service.  Their work included grading for a road, building the picnic and parking area, the stone gate pillars, and placing riprap along the lake shore.  Work on the shelter house was completed in 1934 after they were transferred to the National Park Service.  The park was put under the jurisdiction of Gull Point State Park in 1936.

References

Protected areas established in 1934
Civilian Conservation Corps in Iowa
Rustic architecture in Iowa
Protected areas of Dickinson County, Iowa
Buildings and structures in Dickinson County, Iowa
National Register of Historic Places in Dickinson County, Iowa
State parks of Iowa
Parks on the National Register of Historic Places in Iowa
Historic districts on the National Register of Historic Places in Iowa
Historic districts in Dickinson County, Iowa
1934 establishments in Iowa